Vilim Harangozo was an ethnic Hungarian male former table tennis player from Yugoslavia.

Table tennis career
From 1951 to 1958 he won several medals in singles, doubles, and team events in the Table Tennis European Championships and in the World Table Tennis Championships.

His four World Championship medals included a gold medal in the doubles at the 1954 World Table Tennis Championships with Žarko Dolinar.

He also won three English Open titles.

Football
He also played as footballer at FK Spartak Subotica in the Yugoslav First League during the late 1940s.  He scored the first ever first league goal of Spartak and it was against giants Red Star Belgrade.  He also played with FK Bratstvo Subotica in the season 1948/49.

Personal life
His older brother Tibor Harangozo (1922-1978) was also an international table tennis player.

References

See also
 List of table tennis players
 List of World Table Tennis Championships medalists

1925 births
1975 deaths
Sportspeople from Subotica
Yugoslav table tennis players
Yugoslav footballers
FK Spartak Subotica players
Yugoslav First League players
Association footballers not categorized by position